Balbir Singh Seechewal (born 2 February 1962) is a Nirmala Sikh who spearheaded an anti-river pollution campaign in Punjab, India. He received Indian civilian award Padmashri in 2017. He is also known as Eco Baba.

In his latest project in early 2009, taking up the cudgels to save Buddha Nullah, Seechewal has initiated a campaign for generating awareness amongst different sections of the society to solve the problem of desilting the water body following the failure of the Punjab Pollution Control Board's (PPCB) and industries in complying with the High Court's orders in this regard.

He cleaned and restored Kali Bein river, a 160 km long tributary of Beas in Doaba region of Punjab. Seechewal says that when he started the water-cleaning project of Kali Bein in 2007, it was a challenging task. But, as people became aware of its importance, they joined in cleaning the rivulet, which had become a dried-up drain and had been reduced to a garbage dump with its historic and religious significance long forgotten.

He is a Rajya Sabha member from Punjab. Aam Aadmi Party has selected him for his contributions on environment.

Life
He was born in a Sikh, agricultural family in Seechewal in Jalandhar district in Punjab, India to Chanan Singh and Chanan Kaur. He studied at DAV College, Nakodar. He put on saffron robes in 1981 after dropping out of college.

He was twice a sarpanch of Seechewal.

Awards and honors

Balbir Singh Seechewal (left) receiving Padma Shri award from the President of India Pranab Mukherjee (right) on 30 March 2017.
 Hero of Environment by Time magazine

References

External links
Heroes of the Environment 2008
Nirmal Kuteya Ek Onkar Charitable Trust set up by Seechwal
 

  
  

 

Living people
Punjabi people
Indian environmentalists
Activists from Punjab, India
Recipients of the Padma Shri in social work
Water conservation in India
1962 births
Scholars from Punjab, India
20th-century Indian scholars
21st-century Indian scholars
Aam Aadmi Party politicians 
Rajya Sabha members from Aam Aadmi Party